The Indochinese harvest mouse (Micromys erythrotis) is a species of rodent in the genus Micromys that is native to Asia.

References

Abramov, A.V.; Meschersky, I.G.; Rozhnov, V.V. 2009. On the taxonomic status of the harvest mouse Micromys minutus (Rodentia: Muridae) from Vietnam. Zootaxa 2199: 58–68.

Micromys
Mammals described in 1856
Taxa named by Edward Blyth